Atteslander is a surname. Notable people with the surname include:

Peter Atteslander (1926–2016), Swiss sociologist
Zofia Atteslander (1874– 1928), Polish painter